We Baby Bears is an American animated television series developed by Manny Hernandez for Cartoon Network. It is a spin-off prequel of the animated series We Bare Bears, which was created by Daniel Chong. Produced by Cartoon Network Studios, it premiered on January 1, 2022. On January 31, 2022, the series was renewed for a second season.

Premise
We Baby Bears follows Grizz, Panda, and Ice Bear as babies searching for a new home in a magical teleporting box.

Voice cast
 Connor Andrade as Baby Grizz
 Amari McCoy as Baby Panda
 Max Mitchell as Baby Ice Bear
 Damian O'Hare as Carrot / Castle Guard
Demetri Martin as the Narrator (Martin previously voiced Adult Ice Bear in the original show)
Celebrity guest stars include:  Anjali Bhimani, Rhys Darby,  Janeane Garofalo,  Young M.A.,  Jason Mantzoukas,  Stephen Oyoung,  Willow Smith, and Bernardo Velasco.

Production 
The series was first announced on May 30, 2019, which was slated to premiere on Cartoon Network in spring 2021 but was delayed to January 2022. A trailer was released on November 25, 2021, and the series premiered its first 10 episodes in a marathon on New Year's Day 2022. The series is rendered in an anime-esque style and features the bears going on various adventures in their magical box. Manny Hernandez, who served as supervising director on the original series, serves as the showrunner while Daniel Chong is involved as an executive producer.

The series had a crossover Halloween special with Summer Camp Island, which premiered on October 8, 2022.

Episodes

Home media 
We Baby Bears had its first DVD release on October 25, 2022, consisting of the first 20 episodes from the first season.

References

External links 

We Bare Bears
2020s American animated television series
2020s American children's comedy television series
2022 American television series debuts
American children's animated adventure television series
American children's animated comedy television series
American children's animated fantasy television series
American animated television spin-offs
American prequel television series
Anime-influenced Western animated television series
English-language television shows
Cartoon Network original programming
Cartoon Network franchises
Television series by Cartoon Network Studios
Animated television series about bears
Television series about pandas
Animated television series about brothers
Animated television series about children
Television shows based on webcomics
Fictional trios